Cycnoches haagii is a species of orchid native to tropical South America.

References

haagii
Orchids of South America
Plants described in 1881